Eumictoxenus is a genus of Tephritid or fruit flies in the family Tephritidae.

Species
Eumictoxenus leleupi

References

Dacinae
Tephritidae genera